The Citadel of Warsaw (German: Die Warschauer Zitadelle) is a 1937 German drama film directed by Fritz Peter Buch and starring Lucie Höflich, Werner Hinz and Viktoria von Ballasko. The film's sets were designed by the art directors Karl Haacker and Hermann Warm. It is based on the play Tamten by Gabriela Zapolska, previously made into the 1930 film The Citadel of Warsaw.

Synopsis
In Warsaw, then part of the Russian Empire, Konrad a patriotic revolutionary is targeted by the secret police official Colonel Korniloff.

Cast
 Lucie Höflich as 	Frau Welgorska
 Werner Hinz as 	Konrad - ihr Sohn
 Claire Winter as 	Martha - ihre Tochter
 Viktoria von Ballasko as 	Anna Lasotzka
 Paul Hartmann as 	Oberst Korniloff
 Peter Elsholtz as	Botkin - sein Adjutant
 Hans Leibelt as General Horn
 Walter Richter as Oberleutnant Strelkoff
 Eduard Wesener as Leutnant Nikoforoff
 Agnes Straub as 	Matalkowska
 Maria Sazarina as 	Józia
 Erich Ziegel as 	Dr. Bogdanski
 Otto Collin as 	Marjan - Student

References

Bibliography 
 Goble, Alan. The Complete Index to Literary Sources in Film. Walter de Gruyter, 1999.
 Klaus, Ulrich J. Deutsche Tonfilme: Jahrgang 1947. Klaus-Archiv, 1988.
 Moeller, Felix. The Film Minister: Goebbels and the Cinema in the Third Reich. Edition Axel Menges, 2000.
 Waldman, Harry. Nazi Films in America, 1933-1942. McFarland, 2008.

External links 
 

1937 films
Films of Nazi Germany
German drama films
1937 drama films
1930s German-language films
Films directed by Fritz Peter Buch
Tobis Film films
Films set in Warsaw
German black-and-white films
1930s German films
German films based on plays
Remakes of German films